Ski jumping at the 1948 Winter Olympics consisted of one event held on 7 February. The competition took place at Olympiaschanze with a K-Point of 68m.

Medal summary

Medal table

Norway swept all three medals for the second time, having previously done so in 1932.

Events

Results
Each athlete took two jumps, and were ranked on the total points scored.

Participating NOCs
Fourteen nations participated in ski jumping at the Cortina Games. France and Iceland made the Olympic ski jumping debuts.

References

 
1948 Winter Olympics events
1948
1948 in ski jumping
Ski jumping competitions in Switzerland